Runga is a genus of Polynesian araneomorph spiders in the family Physoglenidae that was first described by Raymond Robert Forster in 1990.

Species
 it contains five species, found on the Polynesian Islands:
Runga akaroa Forster, 1990 – New Zealand
Runga flora Forster, 1990 – New Zealand
Runga moana Forster, 1990 – New Zealand
Runga nina Forster, 1990 (type) – New Zealand
Runga raroa Forster, 1990 – New Zealand

See also
 List of Physoglenidae species

References

Araneomorphae genera
Physoglenidae
Taxa named by Raymond Robert Forster